The 1957–58 season was the 66th season in Liverpool F.C.'s existence and their fourth consecutive year in the Second Division. The club finished in fourth place, just two points outside the automatic promotion places. They also reached the Sixth Round of the FA Cup where they lost two-one by Blackburn Rovers.

Squad

Goalkeepers
 Doug Rudham
 Tommy Younger

Defenders
 Gerry Byrne
 Don Campbell
 Laurie Hughes
 John Molyneux
 Ronnie Moran
 Tom McNulty
 Geoff Twentyman
 Dick White

Midfielders
 Alan A'Court
 James Harrower
 Brian Jackson
 Tony McNamara
 Johnny Morrissey
 Roy Saunders
 Johnny Wheeler
 Barry Wilkinson

Forwards
 Alan Arnell
 Louis Bimpson
 Joe Dickson
 John Evans
 Billy Liddell
 Jimmy Melia
 Bobby Murdoch
 Tony Rowley

Table

Results

Second Division

FA Cup

References
 LFC History.net – 1957-58 season
 Liverweb - 1957-58 Season

Liverpool F.C. seasons
Liverpool